Mi Flow: This Is It is the debut studio album by reggaeton singer Baby Ranks released on August 19, 2008.

Track listing
Intro 
El Amor Se Fue - (featuring Angel Lopez) (Predikador)
Suave (Luny Tunes & Predikador)
Bailando 
Fire - (featuring Erick Right) 
Luna Llena - (featuring La India) (Scarlito)
Noche De Carnaval (Predikador & Natural)
Detras De Ti (Tunes)
Confundido Estoy - (featuring Divino) 
Tell Me Why (Luny Tunes)
Sin Ti - (featuring India) Fred Tovar Chirivella    (Guitarra Acústica)

Enamorado De Ti 
Noche De Perreo (Natural)
Sera La Hora - (featuring Bori) 
De Fuga (Thilo 'La Navaja De Doble Filo')
Estan Llegando (Mambo Kingz)

Chart performance

References

2008 debut albums
Reggaeton albums
Albums produced by Luny Tunes